Members of the Assembly of French Polynesia were elected on 22 April and 6 May 2018. According to second-round results, the 57 representatives consisted of 38 representatives of Tapura Huiraatira, 11 for Tahoera'a Huiraatira, and 8 for Tavini Huiraatira.

Members

Changes
 In August 2018 Tahoera'a Huiraatira MP Bernard Natua switched sides to join Tapura Huiraatira.
 In September 2018 Tahoera'a Huiraatira expelled MP Angélo Frébault from the party. In December 2018 he joined Tapura Huiraatira.
 In October 2018 Tavini Huiraatira leader Oscar Temaru was stripped of his seat after being barred from public office. He was replaced by Cécile Mercier.
 In December 2019 Tapura Huiraatira MP Nicole Sanquer declared that she would sit as an independent.
 In June 2020 Nuihau Laurey left Tapura Huiraatira to sit as an independent.
 In August 2020 Bernard Natua, Teura Tarahu-Atuahiva, and Félix Tokoragi left Tapura Huiraatira and joined independent MPs Nicole Sanquer and Nuihau Laurey and Tahoera'a Huiraatira MP Vaitea Le Gayic to form A here ia Porinetia. In January 2021 Le Gayic resigned and rejoined Tahoera'a, leaving the other 5 MPs as independents.
 Tapeta Tetopata died in March 2021, and was replaced by Maeva Bourgade.
 In March 2022 the Tahoera'a group ceased to be recognised in the Assembly following the resignations of James Heaux and Vaiata Perry-Friedman.
 In June 2022 James Heaux joined Tavini Huiraatira.

References

 2018
French Polynesia